MotiveQuest is a market research business exploiting social 'big data' (e.g., online conversations on Facebook, Twitter, blogs, forums). The company uses proprietary data, software analytics tools and market research strategists.

History and Overview
MotiveQuest was founded in 2003 by David Rabjohns, formerly an EVP at Leo Burnett Worldwide. MotiveQuest is headquartered in Evanston, IL, and maintains offices in New York, NY and Portland, OR.

Competitors
Nielsen Online
GfK Group
Ipsos

References

Forrester Research, How To Choose The Right Social Technologies, March 2008

Forrester Research, The Forrester Wave Vendor Summary, Q3 2006

Forrester Research, The Forrester Wave: Brand Monitoring, Q3 2006

External links
 Official Website

Market research companies of the United States